NWF may refer to:

 The National Wildlife Federation
 The National Wrestling Federation
 The Northwest Front, a political movement founded by Harold Covington